"5 O'Clock" is a song by American rapper T-Pain featuring fellow American rapper Wiz Khalifa and British singer Lily Allen, which serves as the second official single from the former's fourth studio album, Revolver. It peaked at number ten on the Billboard Hot 100, becoming Allen's first top ten single in the United States.

Background and release
Lily Allen's part in the song is sampled from her 2009 single "Who'd Have Known", which in turn resembles Take That's 2007 single "Shine". Allen states that T-Pain initially heard her song while he was placed on hold by a store, and immediately looked her up after he was done. After being approached with the new song idea by T-Pain, Allen stated she was "flattered by what he did to my original track."

"5 O'Clock" was released on iTunes on September 27, 2011, and was released to U.S. Top 40 radio stations on October 18, 2011. The song was the last release by T-Pain under the now-defunct label Jive Records. The single was released in Allen's native United Kingdom on 4 December 2011.

Music video
The official music video for the song was released in September 2011. Parts of the video were filmed in Amsterdam's red light district, a choice that T-Pain decided to make after being told it was illegal to film there. It features scenes of T-Pain walking through streets of Amsterdam's red-light district. Billboard called the video "emotional" as T-Pain fails to get in touch with his girlfriend through text messages. While T-Pain and Wiz Khalifa appear in the video, Lily Allen is absent due to her pregnancy at the time. An actress resembling Allen starred as T-Pain's girlfriend named "Lily" in the video.

Critical reception
Consequence of Sound stated that the collaborators worked well together. The mixture of the artists’ styles was also complimented by Kiss FM as well as T-Pain's subtle use of autotune. Rock NYC applauded how the song built upon Allen's original sample.

Remixes
The official remix of the song features Lily Allen and Puerto Rican duo Wisin & Yandel, and was released on iTunes on November 18, 2011. Remixes were also made by other artists, including Nelly, Young Kye, and DJ Unk. The radio version of this song cuts T-Pain's second verse. There is also another version of this song which cuts Wiz Khalifa's rap, and which was included on the compilation album Now That's What I Call Music! 41.

Formats and track listings
 CD single
 "5 O'Clock" (featuring Wiz Khalifa & Lily Allen) - 4:41
 "Best Love Song" (V.I.P Mix) (featuring Chris Brown) - 4:24

 Digital download - Explicit Single (iTunes)
 "5 O'Clock" (featuring Wiz Khalifa & Lily Allen) - 4:41 (Explicit)

 Digital download - Clean Single (iTunes)
 "5 O'Clock" (featuring Wiz Khalifa & Lily Allen) - 4:40 (Clean)

Charts and certifications

Weekly charts

Year-end charts

Certifications

Release history

References

2011 singles
T-Pain songs
Wiz Khalifa songs
Lily Allen songs
Song recordings produced by T-Pain
Songs written by Lily Allen
Contemporary R&B ballads
2010 songs
Music videos directed by Erik White
Songs written by Gary Barlow
Songs written by Mark Owen
Songs written by Howard Donald
Songs written by T-Pain
Songs written by Jason Orange
Songs written by Wiz Khalifa
Songs written by Steve Robson
2010s ballads